Murarilal Singh (19 May 1952 – 4 December 2013) was an Indian politician. He was a member of the Indian Parliament representing the Sarguja (Lok Sabha constituency).

References

1952 births
2013 deaths
India MPs 2009–2014
Lok Sabha members from Chhattisgarh
People from Surguja district
Bharatiya Janata Party politicians from Chhattisgarh